Ponga may refer to:

People with the surname 
 Kalyn Ponga (born 1998), Australian rugby league footballer
 Maurice Ponga (born 1947), French politician

Places 
 Ponga, Arkhangelsk Oblast
 Ponga, Asturias, municipality in Spain
 Ponga, Boulgou

Other uses 
 Ponga (Cyathea dealbata), the silver tree fern endemic to New Zealand
 Ponga (band), an improvisational contemporary jazz/fusion ensemble
 Ponga (album), debut album by the above